Salado River is a river of Chile located in El Loa Province, Antofagasta Region which is in the northern part of the country. It is formed at the confluence of over 30  spring branches emerging from El Tatio area. Flowing briefly south, it turns west and passes through a canyon carved in volcanic rocks.

In its middle course, the river receives the Toconce River (originated at the foot of Linzor volcano) from the north and the Caspana River from the south. In this area, a part of the flow of its affluents is diverted for providing water for domestic consumption in Antofagasta and Tocopilla, among other localities.

After being joined by the two streams before mentioned, the Salado River enters in a floodplain area, which is used for pasturage by the inhabitants of the nearby localities, including Toconce, Caspana and Aiquina. Then, the Salado again flows through a narrow canyon, where is found the so-called Devil's Bridge, a cut through rhyolite terrain of 5 m wide.

Finally, the Salado empties into the Loa River, the main watercourse of the Chilean Norte Grande, about 3 km south of Chiuchiu.

References

This article draws heavily on the corresponding article in the Spanish-language Wikipedia, accessed August 16, 2007.
 

Rivers of Antofagasta Region
Rivers of Chile